Hercules and the Amazon Women is the first television movie in the syndicated fantasy series Hercules: The Legendary Journeys and marked the debut of Kevin Sorbo as the titular character Hercules and co-starred Anthony Quinn, Michael Hurst, Roma Downey and Lucy Lawless.

In the film, a village of only men comes to seek Hercules' aid in defeating a band of mysterious creatures on the eve of Iolaus' wedding. Hercules discovers these "creatures" are really the women of the village who have split with their chauvinistic men and aligned themselves with Hera.

Plot
Three men are walking through the woods, they hear strange noises and catch glimpses of something moving in the undergrowth. Suddenly they are attacked by unseen creatures. Two men are killed, but one escapes and flees the woods.

Hercules strolls into a village after returning from one of his adventures, and is greeted by Iolaus. It is established that Iolaus is getting married and that Hercules is the best man. The two men set off for Alcmene's house. While walking through the woods, they reminisce that it has been a long time since they last saw each other. Iolaus tells Hercules about his bride-to-be, Ania. They stumble upon a little girl crying alone near an altar. She tells them that a monster killed her father while they were placing an offering to the goddess. Hercules tries to comfort the girl and asks if he can help, but the girl transforms into a monster. Hercules chops off its head, and thinking it is now dead, he and Iolaus begin walking away. They hear a noise and turn around to see that the monster is not dead, and has now grown two new heads in the place where the previous one was. The monster is a Hydra. Hercules tells Iolaus to grab the torch from the altar, Hercules cuts off the heads and burns the Hydra, preventing it from growing new heads, thus killing it. After the Hydra is destroyed a peacock feather remains in its place, and Hercules tells Iolaus that Hera is responsible for the Hydra.

Hercules and Iolaus finally reach his mother's house. Iolaus invites them both for dinner, then leaves. While the four are enjoying dinner, Ania glimpses a man outside the window and Hercules goes to investigate. It is the Gargarean Pithus, the man who escaped the creatures at the beginning of the film. He explains to Hercules about his village being attacked by creatures and Hercules agrees to help. Iolaus persuades Hercules to let him go along for one last adventure before he is married, Hercules reluctantly relents and says that he can come along. The three men set off for the village. When they arrive Hercules asks where all the women are, Pithus tells him that they were stolen by the creatures in the forest. Hercules and Iolaus head off to find the beasts and rescue the village's women. In the forest they are ambushed by the beasts, managing to stave off the attack for a time until Iolaus discovers that the beasts are really women. He chases after one but is fatally injured in the fight, and dies in Hercules' arms. Hercules is then surrounded by several of the 'beasts'. Two of them approach him with spears. One of the 'creatures' cries out and says "No stop!", and then raises her mask. It happens to be a woman, who then says "The queen will want to kill him". Hercules is in utter shock to discover the true nature of the 'beasts'.

Hercules is then seen being taken captive by the women, bound in chains and gagged with a black leather strap. He is surrounded by the "Amazon Women Warriors" and led through the village full of women. An older woman offers to buy Hercules and several taunt him along the way to see the queen. When he arrives Hippolyta tells him that she knows he is here to defeat them. Hercules tells her she is wrong. Using a magic candle, Hippolyta turns Hercules into a baby telling him she will show him what he is really like. As Hercules reverts to infant form we are shown flashbacks to Hercules's youth and times when he has been told by people how to behave toward women. Later he returns to adult state, realizing that Hippolyta is right and that his attitude toward women is wrong, he tells her that he can change. She says that he cannot change and that all men are the same. Hippolyta goes to consult with Hera, she tells Hippolyta to lead an attack on the village.

Hercules escapes from the Amazons and warns the men of the village of the forthcoming attack. He prepares them for when the women arrive. The women ride into the village and order the men to remove their clothes, telling them they are here for only one thing. The men tell the women to sit and talk with them for a while. Pithus's wife enters her home, and her son Franco asks if she really is his mother. He tells her he often dreams about her but she has no face, she removes her mask and shows her face to Franco. Hercules stands up to Hippolyta, who says she's not afraid of Hercules. He kisses her, she tells him she is not afraid and kisses him back. The two make love. The following day the women are still with the men. The Amazons return to their city and both men and women reminisce about the night before. Hera tells Hippolyta that Hercules has tricked her and orders her to attack the village again, this time killing all the men and boys. Hippolyta refuses but Hera possesses her. Hera, now in control of Hippolyta's actions, orders the women to attack the village.

Hercules stops Hippolyta and realizes that she is possessed by Hera. She rides off and Hercules goes after her. As they fight Hercules tries to get through to Hippolyta, telling her that she is stronger than Hera and to fight her control, but it proves futile. 
Pithus then arrives to aid Hercules, preventing Hera from striking a killing blow to him. She grabs Pithus and holds a knife to his throat. Despite Hercules’s plea, Hera cuts Pithus’s throat, which ignites Hercules’s fury enough to best her. 
Hercules is about to deal the fatal blow, but stops as he realises he would be killing Hippolyta, not Hera. Hercules flees, but Hera follows, goading him, and eventually cornering him at the top of a large waterfall. He tells Hera that if he or Hippolyta has to die then he will give up his life for her, saying he could not live his life without her. Upon hearing this Hera runs Hippolyta's body over the edge of the waterfall, killing her.

Hercules returns to the City of Amazons and retrieves the candle Hippolyta used to send him back to his childhood. Zeus appears and tells him the candle does not work in the way Hercules wants it to. Hercules replies that Zeus could make it work that way. Zeus tells Hercules that if he did that he would be in big trouble with Hera, but Hercules persuades him anyway. Zeus blows out the candle and Hercules is taken back to the night of the dinner. Ania sees Pithus outside the window and Hercules goes to tell him that the village does not need his help. He explains that all the men need to do is treat the women with respect and things will sort themselves out. Pithus returns to the village and when the women come the men sort out the problems that have been occurring. Alcmene asks Hercules if there is a woman out there who will make him happy like Ania did for Iolaus, and Hercules replies that he is sure there is as he thinks about Hippolyta.

Cast
 Kevin Sorbo as Hercules
 Anthony Quinn as Zeus
 Roma Downey as Hippolyta 
 Michael Hurst as Iolaus
 Lloyd Scott as Pithus
 Lucy Lawless as Lysia
 Christopher Brougham as Lethan
 Jennifer Ludlam as Alcmene
 Rose McIver as Girl (Hydra)

External links
 

Hercules: The Legendary Journeys
Films set in ancient Greece
New Zealand television films
Films about Heracles
Films directed by Bill L. Norton